Acraea lusinga is a butterfly in the family Nymphalidae. It is found in the Democratic Republic of the Congo (Haut-Lomani), western Tanzania and western Zambia. The habitat consists of Brachystegia woodland, savanna and open areas.

Taxonomy
It is a member of the Acraea rahira species group-   but see also Pierre & Bernaud, 2014

References

Butterflies described in 1955
lusinga